Spin is a 2003 American drama film starring Ryan Merriman, Stanley Tucci, Dana Delany, Paula Garcés and Rubén Blades. It was released at the Cannes Film Market 17 May 2004 and was limited released in the United States 15 October 2004. Spin was adapted from a novel by Donald Everett Axinn. The film won two awards at the Heartland Film Festival in 2003.

Cast
 Ryan Merriman as Eddie Haley
 Stanley Tucci as Frank Haley
 Dana Delany as Margaret
 Paula Garcés as Francesca
 Rubén Blades as Ernesto

References

External links
 
 

2003 drama films
2003 films
American drama films
2000s English-language films
2000s American films